Julia Zemiro (born 14 April 1967) is a French-born Australian television presenter, radio host, actress, singer, writer and comedian. She is best known as the host of the music quiz and live performance show RocKwiz. Zemiro is a fluent French speaker and has acted in French.

Early life and education
Zemiro's mother, Jane, is a retired teacher and education academic (University of Sydney) originally from Queensland. Her French father, Claude, was a retired restaurateur. In 1970, when she was two and a half years old, Zemiro's family moved from her birthplace, France, to Australia.

Zemiro attended Sydney Girls High School and the University of Sydney, where she studied for a Bachelor of Arts. She was accepted into the Victorian College of the Arts Drama School and moved to Melbourne in 1992. She graduated from VCA in 1994 with a Diploma of Dramatic Arts (Acting).

Acting
After graduation, Zemiro found work touring with the Bell Shakespeare Company. She has featured in short films including The Extra and Muffled Love, winning the Tropfest Best Actress award twice, in 1999 (for The Extra) and in 2001 (for Muffled Love). She co-wrote, performed and directed Backpackers for the 2000 Melbourne International Comedy Festival.

Zemiro appeared as "Bronya" in Eurovision, the Musical (2003), Euromax 7 The Musical (2004) and Eürobeat: Almost Eurovision (2006).

A long-time Theatresports veteran, Zemiro played at the Belvoir St Theatre, Sydney, for many years before her move to Melbourne. She performed with Impro Melbourne, starring in their annual season of Celebrity Theatresports and regularly appeared in their Melbourne International Comedy Festival hit, "Late Nite Impro". She was a core cast member of the improvised stage show Spontaneous Broadway.

In 2014, Zemiro played Roxane's duenna in Edmond Rostand's 1897 play Cyrano de Bergerac opposite Richard Roxburgh's Cyrano with the Sydney Theatre Company.

Television

Zemiro first appeared as a television presenter as the host of World Telly 2, an international co-production. She previously appeared in the original World Telly as part of an improvised comedy group. The World Telly programmes were broadcast by ABC's Australia Television, the ABC's original but now defunct venture into international satellite broadcasting.

During her time with the Bell Shakespeare Company, Zemiro became a regular panelist and debater for Good News Week as well as a writer and performer for two seasons on Totally Full Frontal in which she played over 30 characters.

Since 2005, she has hosted RocKwiz on SBS, a music quiz show usually recorded at The Espy.

Subsequently, Zemiro has enjoyed a variety of performances on television. She appeared in an episode of CNNNN as the host of "Animal Farm". She was a judge on LifeStyle Food's Great BBQ Challenge in 2006 and 2007. In 2006, she appeared on the comedy show The Wedge as various characters.

In May/June 2006, Zemiro hosted the one-off SBS series Song for the Socceroos, a talent show in search of a theme song for the Australian Socceroos soccer team for the 2006 FIFA World Cup. The group Freedom of Thought won the competition with their song "Green and Gold (Song for the Socceroos)", which peaked at number 26 on the ARIA Charts.

In 2007, Zemiro appeared in and won Australia's Brainiest TV Star. The same year, she was a contestant on Channel Seven's It Takes Two, paired with Dave Gleeson; they were the fourth pair to be eliminated.

Zemiro has appeared in television commercials, including as a satiric French fashion expert called Fifi La Croix for Target's breast cancer campaign. She appeared as a guest in the third episode of Top Gear Australia and in 2009 on ADbc. She appeared as a frequent participant on Thank God You're Here and Talkin' 'Bout Your Generation. In 2011, she appeared in the final episode of The Bazura Project's Guide To Sinema as a fake chat show host.

Together with 3RRR radio personality Sam Pang, Zemiro has acted as a commentator for the SBS broadcast of the Eurovision Song Contests in 2009 in Moscow, Russia, in 2010 in Oslo, Norway, in 2011 in Düsseldorf, Germany, in 2012 in Baku, Azerbaijan, in 2013 in Malmö, Sweden, in 2014 in Copenhagen, Denmark, in 2015 in Vienna, Austria, and in 2016, in Stockholm, Sweden.

She appeared in Conspiracy 365 during 2012, a 12 part Australian drama series on FMC as Oriana De La Force.

Zemiro appeared on BBC's QI in November 2012, after appearing on stage with Stephen Fry and Alan Davies on QI Live (stage version of the QI show) in Melbourne in December 2011. She has subsequently appeared on QI in January 2013 and January 2016.

She took the French-speaking role of Isabelle in the 2013 ABC TV film An Accidental Soldier, a film directed by Rachel Ward and set in France during World War I. Her interview program, Julia Zemiro's Home Delivery, in which she interviewed five Australian comedians in five episodes, began on ABC1 on 18 September 2013.

Zemiro could be seen on screens across Europe when she appeared on a video-clip insert to the tongue-in-cheek interval act of the second semi-final of the Eurovision Song Contest 2014 in Copenhagen. She led a recorded plea to the EBU asking that Australia be allowed to join Eurovision, before being seen in a helicopter 'moving' Australia to its new position in the centre of Europe.

Zemiro hosted the 2014 New Year's Eve telecast from Sydney Harbour with Toby Truslove for ABC TV.

In 2021 she appeared in a co-starring role in the comedy series Fisk and hosted the live television special Australia's Biggest Singalong! with Miranda Tapsell.

Political views and activities
Zemiro MC'd the feminist March 4 Justice protest rally outside Parliament House, Canberra, in March 2021. In September 2021, Zemiro hosted the launch of the Independent climate activist Kylea Tink's campaign against sitting Liberal Member for North Sydney Trent Zimmerman.

On 3 September 2020, Zemiro posted in a tweet that former-Liberal Prime Minister Tony Abbott is "a dickhead that keeps on giving and why won’t he shut up." During the 2021 Delta Variant outbreak of COVID-19, Zemiro called for Liberal Premier Gladys Berejiklian to be replaced, because New South Wales experienced 390 cases of the contagious variant in a day. Following Berejiklian's resignation in October, Zemiro declared her opposition to Dominic Perrottet becoming premier and posted a petition which said white men who are "openly religious" should not hold leadership positions.

Zemiro's ABC program Julia Zemiro's Home Delivery covers contemporary political and cultural issues through personal interviews with celebrities, artists, politicians, and political commentators such as Derryn Hinch, Jacqui Lambie, Germaine Greer, Barrie Cassidy and Gillian Triggs. Zemiro praised human rights commissioner Gillian Triggs as a formidable "social justice advocate [whose] investigation into Australia's human rights record [won] her a legion of friends and some very powerful enemies". The program defended Triggs against criticism of political bias.

In February 2022, a New Year's Eve Tweet by Zemiro was queried in a Senate Estimates hearing in relation to the ABC's social media guidelines on impartiality and balance. Zemiro tweeted: "On this final day of 2021 I pledge to do whatever I can to vote this NSW state and Federal govt out I'm not sure what the alternatives will be But I WILL NOT reward @ScottMorrisonMP @Dom_Perrottet and their ilk with another 'go' at it."  ABC Managing Director David Anderson said "Ms Zemiro is not a journalist, so she's not reporting on politics at any particular point in time. She has a factual entertainment program and is espousing her own views."

References

External links

"Macbeth review" (Zemiro as Lady Macbeth) by Daniel Ziffer, The Age (20 July 2004)

1967 births
Living people
People from Aix-en-Provence
University of Sydney alumni
Victorian College of the Arts alumni
French emigrants to Australia
Australian actresses
Australian game show hosts
Australian people of French descent
Australian women comedians
People educated at Sydney Girls High School